Patissa fulvipunctalis is a moth in the family Crambidae. It was described by George Hampson in 1919. It is found in Uganda.

The wingspan is about 16 mm. The forewings are silvery white with a slight orange-fulvous discoidal spot and a subterminal spot. The hindwings are white.

References

Endemic fauna of Uganda
Moths described in 1919
Schoenobiinae